Kẻ Sặt is a township in Bình Giang District, Hải Dương Province, Vietnam. It had a population of 4,954 people in 1994.

References

Populated places in Hải Dương province